Michael Gallup (born March 4, 1996) is an American football wide receiver for the Dallas Cowboys of the National Football League (NFL). He played college football at Butler Community College before transferring to Colorado State, where he was a Consensus All-American in 2017. He was drafted by the Cowboys in the third round of the 2018 NFL Draft.

Early years
Gallup attended Monroe Area High School in Monroe, Georgia, where he played football, baseball, basketball, and ran track. He started focusing on football as a junior, playing quarterback in a triple option offense.

As a senior, Gallup played wide receiver and running back, registering 28 receptions for 637 yards (22.8-yard average) and 10 receiving touchdowns, 37 carries for 484 yards (13.1-yard average) and seven rushing touchdowns. He helped his team advance to the second round of the Class 4A playoffs.

College career
Gallup moved on to Butler Community College to improve his grades. As a freshman in 2014, he led the team with 780 receiving yards and 11 touchdowns. Against Dodge City Community College, he tallied five receptions for 287 yards and three touchdowns.

In 2015, Gallup played in only three games due to an ankle injury and had nine receptions for 74 yards and a touchdown.

In 2016, Gallup transferred to Colorado State University. He started slow in his first season, but began to increase his production after his third game against the University of Northern Colorado, when he had 4 receptions for 82 yards and one touchdown. He played in all 13 games (11 starts), recording 76 receptions for 1,272 yards (tied for first in the conference) and 14 touchdowns.

As a senior in 2017, Gallup was a finalist for the Fred Biletnikoff Award. He started all 13 games, posting 100 receptions (school record) for 1,413 yards and seven touchdowns.

Gallup finished his career with various accomplishments. He had three of the top eight single-game all-time receiving performances in school history, four of the top ten games in school history for receptions, ranked second in single-season receiving touchdowns (14), only player in school history to catch three or more touchdowns three times, record for single-season receptions (100), second-best single-season receiving yards (1,413), ranked fifth in career receptions (176).

College statistics

Professional career 
On November 20, 2017, it was announced that Gallup had accepted his invitation to play in the Senior Bowl. On January 27, 2018, Gallup caught three passes for 60-yards and was part of Denver Broncos' head coach Vance Joseph's North team that lost 45–16 to the South coach by Houston Texans' head coach Bill O'Brien. He attended the NFL Scouting Combine in Indianapolis and completed all of the combine and positional drills. On March 7, 2018, Gallup participated at Colorado State's pro day and performed the 40-yard dash (4.45s), 20-yard dash (2.63s), 10-yard dash (1.57s), broad jump (10'8"), short shuttle (4.52s), and three-cone drill (7.09s). At the conclusion of the pre-draft process, Gallup was projected to be a third round pick by NFL draft experts and scouts. He was ranked as the 10th best wide receiver prospect in the draft by DraftScout.com and was ranked the 14th best wide receiver by Scouts Inc.

The Dallas Cowboys selected Gallup in the third round with the 81st overall pick in the 2018 NFL Draft. Gallup was the ninth wide receiver drafted in 2018.

On May 21, 2018, the Dallas Cowboys signed Gallup to a four-year, $3.52 million contract that includes a signing bonus of $889,980.

2018 season
Gallup made his NFL debut in the season-opening 16–8 loss to the Carolina Panthers, catching one pass for nine yards. On October 21, he caught his first NFL touchdown on a 49-yard pass from Dak Prescott in a 20–17 loss to the Washington Redskins in Week 7.

Gallup finished his rookie year with 33 receptions for 507 yards and two touchdowns.

2019 season

During the season-opener against the New York Giants, Gallup caught seven passes for 158 yards in the 35–17 victory. He missed Weeks 3–4 due to a knee surgery. During Week 11 against the Detroit Lions, Gallup finished with nine receptions for 148 yards in the 35–27 road victory. Three weeks later against the Chicago Bears on Thursday Night Football, he caught six passes for 109 yards and a touchdown in the 31–24 road loss. In the regular-season finale against the Washington Redskins, he caught five passes for 98 yards and three touchdowns in the 47–16 victory. Overall, Gallup finished the 2019 season with 66 receptions for 1,107 receiving yards and six receiving touchdowns.

2020 season
During Week 3 against the Seattle Seahawks, Gallup finished with six receptions for 138 receiving yards and a touchdown as the Cowboys lost 31–38. In Week 16 against the Philadelphia Eagles, Gallup recorded six catches for 121 yards and two touchdowns during the 37–17 victory. Overall, Gallup finished the 2020 season with 59 receptions for 843 receiving yards and five receiving touchdowns.

2021 season
On September 14, 2021, Gallup was placed on injured reserve after suffering a calf injury in Week 1. He was activated on November 13. During Week 17 against the Arizona Cardinals, Gallup suffered a torn ACL on a touchdown, and was placed back on injured reserve several days later.

2022 season
On March 13, 2022, Gallup signed a five-year, $62.5 million extension with the Cowboys.

NFL career statistics

Regular season

Postseason

Personal life
Gallup was adopted when he was 10 months old.

References

External links
Colorado State Rams bio
Dallas Cowboys bio

1996 births
Living people
People from Monroe, Georgia
Players of American football from Georgia (U.S. state)
American football wide receivers
Butler Grizzlies football players
Colorado State Rams football players
All-American college football players
Dallas Cowboys players
Ed Block Courage Award recipients